Li Nian (born 30 May 1985) is a Chinese actress. Li's most notable role to date is as Guo Haizao, a college graduate who was nurtured by a successful man, on the television series Dwelling Narrowness.

Biography
Li was born in Jingshan County, Hubei, on May 30, 1985. She graduated from Shanghai Theatre Academy.

In 2004, Li made her television debut in Unlimited Speed. That same year, she also had a supporting role in the historical comedy television series Jianghu Qiao Jiaren, which starred Christy Chung, Liang Guanhua, and Du Chun.

Li appeared in Jasmine Flower (2005), playing the daughter of Chen Daoming's character.

In 2006 Li made her film debut with a small role in Fearless, which stars Jet Li as Huo Yuanjia.

In 2008, Li was cast in the role for which she is best known, the character of Guo Haizao on the television Dwelling Narrowness.

Li appeared in You Xiaogang's historical television series The Legend of Yang Guifei (2009), as the mother of Yang Guifei, who was played by Yin Tao. That same year, she starred with Shen Xiaohai in the romantic drama Don't Lie to Me. 

In 2010, she had key supporting role in the horror film Midnight Beating. It was directed by Zhang Jiabei and starring Hong Kong veteran actors Simon Yam and Francis Ng. 

In 2011, two television dramas she headlined, Marriage Management and Xia Yan's Autumn. She starred as Luo Qingniao, reuniting her with co-star Zhu Yuchen, who played her husband Ye Xiaoyu, in the romantic television series Marriage Management. She co-starred with Yin Xiaotian, whom played her husband, in another romantic television series Xia Yan's Autumn. That same year, she had a supporting role in the film Love Is Not Blind, which was adapted from an online novel written by Bao Jingjing.

Li starred opposite Zheng Kai in Tricks of Love (2013), playing his wife Jia Dianna. 

In 2019, Li was cast as Zhu Li in All Is Well, opposite Ni Dahong, Yao Chen and Guo Jingfei.  For her performance in that series, Li was also nominated for a Best Supporting Actress award at the 25th Shanghai Television Festival.

Personal life
In early December 2010, on the talk show Very Quiet Distance, Li Nian revealed that she had already been engaged in the United States. On the afternoon of July 13, 2011, Li Nian admitted on her sina weibo that she had registered for marriage in Hong Kong with Lin Heping, a partner of Softbank Saifu. Their daughter Jessica was born on January 25, 2012. On March 14, 2015, she gave birth to a second child, nicknamed Wangzai.

Filmography

Film

Television

References

External links

1985 births
People from Jingmen
Living people
Shanghai Theatre Academy alumni
Chinese television actresses
Chinese film actresses
21st-century Chinese actresses